Martin Field  is a privately owned, public-use airport located one mile (2 km) west of the central business district of College Place, a city in Walla Walla County, Washington, United States. The airport was founded in the early 1940s by Herman L. Martin. During World War II, it served as a training ground for approximately 2500 United States Navy aviators.

Facilities and aircraft 
For the 12-month period ending June 30, 2007, the airport had 5,000 general aviation aircraft operations, an average of 13 per day. At that time there were 53 aircraft based at this airport: 87% single-engine, 2% multi-engine and 11% ultralight.

References

External links 
Martin Field at Washington State DOT

Airports in Washington (state)
Transportation buildings and structures in Walla Walla County, Washington
World War II airfields in the United States